SPW may refer to:
 Schroders Personal Wealth, a British financial planning company operated as a joint venture between Schroders and Lloyds Banking Group.
 The Schützenpanzerwagen, Sd.Kfz. 251, an armoured fighting vehicle built by Germany during World War II
 Semi Precious Weapons, an American glam rock band.
 Sexuality Policy Watch, a global activist and research forum on sexuality, policies and politics; based in Brazil.
 MTR station code for Shui Pin Wai stop, Hong Kong
 Singapore Pro Wrestling, the first professional wrestling promotion in Singapore.
 The Socialist Party of Washington, a state affiliate of the Socialist Party of America established in 1901
 South Pole Wall, massive cosmic structure formed by a giant wall of galaxies (a galaxy filament).
 The IATA code for Spencer Municipal Airport, a public airport in Spencer, Iowa.
 SPW, the SAME code for a shelter-in-place warning.
 SPX Corporation, based on its symbol on the New York Stock Exchange, SPW.
 St Peter's Woodlands Grammar School, a co-educational Anglican primary school located in Adelaide, South Australia.
 Students Partnership Worldwide, an international development charity specialising in youth-to-youth education